Laelia furfuracea is a species of orchid endemic to Mexico (Oaxaca).

furfuracea